St Paul's Church is in the village of Hooton, Cheshire, England.  It is an active Anglican parish church in the deanery of Wirral South, the archdeaconry of Chester, and the diocese of Chester.  The church is recorded in the National Heritage List for England as a designated Grade II* listed building.  The authors of the Buildings of England series describe it as "unquestionably one of the most spectacular churches of Cheshire".

History

The church was built between 1858 and 1862 to a design by James K. Colling for the Liverpool banker R. C. Naylor at a cost of £5,000.

Architecture

Exterior
St Paul's is constructed in a mixture of red and white ashlar stone and red rock-faced stone.  The roofs are slated.  The plan of the church is cruciform.  It consists of a three-bay nave, north and south aisles, north and south transepts, a chancel with north and south aisles continuing as an ambulatory, a west porch and a south porch.  Above the crossing is the base of a dome rising from pendentives surmounted by a lantern with a short spire. Above the south porch is a detached belfry spire.  The west porch is Romanesque in style, and above it is a rose window.  Some of the other windows in the church are Romanesque, while others have pointed arches with plate tracery.

Interior
Inside the church the arcades are carried on Peterhead granite, with capitals in French Early Gothic style.  The font is made from dark green serpentine.  It dates from 1851, and gained a medal at the Great Exhibition that year. The stained glass includes windows by Heaton, Butler and Bayne, Clayton and Bell, and Kempe.  The two-manual organ was built by Rushworth and Dreaper.

External features
The churchyard contains the war graves of five World War II airmen, four British and one Australian.

See also

Grade II* listed buildings in Cheshire West and Chester
Listed buildings in Hooton, Cheshire

References

Church of England church buildings in Cheshire
Grade II* listed churches in Cheshire
Renaissance Revival architecture in the United Kingdom
Gothic Revival church buildings in England
Gothic Revival architecture in Cheshire
Churches completed in 1862
Diocese of Chester
1862 establishments in England